The Gym Group is a chain of 24/7 no contract fitness clubs in the United Kingdom. The company was listed on the London Stock Exchange in 2015. It was founded in 2007 and has grown rapidly, with over 228 gyms across the UK as of 2023. The company's gyms offer a range of cardio and strength-training equipment, as well as group exercise classes and personal training services. The Gym Group's membership model allows customers to pay a monthly fee to access all of its gyms, rather than paying for each visit individually. The company is headquartered in London, England.

Operations

The company was founded in 2007 and its first site was in West London. It now has over 200 gyms with 750,000+ members. Some of these sites were acquired from EasyGym and Lifestyle Fitness.

Finances
Phoenix Equity Partners and Bridges Ventures invested in the company in its early years. The Gym Group floated on the London Stock Exchange in 2015. In 2018, The Gym Group had revenue of £124 million and EBITDA of £37 million.

The Gym Group and PureGym explored a merger in 2014, but this was later abandoned.

References

External links

Health clubs in the United Kingdom
British companies established in 2007
Companies listed on the London Stock Exchange